Bunty Aur Babli 2 is a 2021 Indian Hindi-language crime comedy film written and directed by debutante Varun V. Sharma, based on a story by producer Aditya Chopra, under the Yash Raj Films banner. A sequel to the 2005 film Bunty Aur Babli, the film stars Saif Ali Khan, Rani Mukerji, Siddhant Chaturvedi and debutante Sharvari Wagh.

Initially planned for release in June 2020 and then in April 2021, the film was postponed on both occasions due to the COVID-19 pandemic in India. It was finally released theatrically on 19 November 2021.

Plot 
Sixteen years have passed since Rakesh Trivedi (Saif Ali Khan) and his wife Vimmi Saluja Trivedi (Rani Mukerji) retired from conning others with the brand "Bunty Aur Babli" for money, having been let go by DCP Dashrath Singh. 

A businessman named Chaddha (Neeraj Sood), as well as his rich affiliates, decide to invest money in a "party nation" by Chaddha's assistant and his friend. However, it soon turns out that Chaddha and his associates have been conned, and the culprits, revealed to be Kunal Singh (Siddhant Chaturvedi) and Sonia Rawat (Sharvari Wagh), decide to take on the pseudonym "Bunty Aur Babli", having heard stories of the original "Bunty Aur Babli" who were never caught, assuming that they would be able to escape from the clutches of the law, too. Rakesh has since become a railway ticket collector at Phursatganj, Uttar Pradesh and Vimmi, a homemaker who looks after her now grown up son, Pappu. Pretty soon, they are holed up by the police, whence Inspector Jatayu Singh, who previously served as JCP Dashrath's junior, refuses to take their word for it after confronting them with the "Bunty Aur Babli" fiasco, and keeps them under prison surveillance. Despite these efforts, however, Varanasi's Mayor Chutvaa Chaubey is conned by "Bunty Aur Babli" yet again, albeit on a good note for a social cause. Nonetheless, a fuming Rakesh and Vimmi decide to find out whoever is misusing their identity and capture the flag, claiming that they are the real players. What follows is a cat-and-mouse game and, later as the duo discover Kunal's and Sonia's identity, a war between the two con-couples, which culminates in a con job in Abu Dhabi.

Cast 
 Saif Ali Khan as Rakesh "Bunty" Trivedi/Bobby Bhullar
 Rani Mukerji as Vimmi "Babli" Saluja Trivedi/Cutie Bhullar
 Siddhant Chaturvedi as Kunal "Bunty" Singh
 Sharvari Wagh as Sonia "Babli" Rawat/Jasmine "Jazz" Singh
 Pankaj Tripathi as Police Inspector Jatayu Singh
 Yashpal Sharma as Chutwa Chaubey
 Mohit Baghel as Golu Chaubey
 Rajat Ajay Bose
 Asrani as Thehrey Singh
 Gopal Datt as IT Officer Nand Kishore 
 Prem Chopra as Papaji
 Lankesh Bhardwaj
 Neeraj Sood as Karan Chaddha
 Brijendra Kala as Mehmood
 Agrim Mittal as Dev "Pappy" Trivedi
 Amitabh Bachchan in archive footage as DCP Dashrath Singh
 Rajiv Gupta as Inspector Ram Gupta

Production
The film was announced in December 2019 as a spiritual sequel to the 2005 film in December 2019 by Yash Raj Films. Siddhant Chaturvedi and newcomer Sharvari Wagh were chosen as the younger leads of the film. While both Rani Mukerji and Abhishek Bachchan were asked by Yash Raj Films to reprise their roles, Bachchan was unable to confirm, leading to Saif Ali Khan being cast opposite Mukerji.

Release 
The film was announced on 17 December 2019 and filming started on the same day. Although scheduled for theatrical release on 26 June 2020, the release was postponed due to the COVID-19 pandemic. The film was wrapped up in September 2020. The release was postponed due to Coronavirus second wave. It was released theatrically on 19 November 2021.

Reception

Critical response 
Upon release, Bunty Aur Babli 2 received mixed to negative reviews from the film critics. On the review aggregator website Rotten Tomatoes, the film holds a score of 18% based on 11 reviews and an average rating of 4.75/10.

Karishma Shetty of Pinkvilla gave the film a rating of 3/5 and wrote, ‘‘Bunty Aur Babli 2 is a cinematic heist that we didn't sign up for but the scene-stealing cast reels you in and are successfully able to scam you out of your hard-earned money for a one-time movie ticket and popcorn.’’ Monika Rawal Kukreja of Hindustan Times described the film as a ‘‘snooze-fest’’ and wrote, ‘‘Rani Mukerji is the saving grace in this snooze-fest, don't watch even if paid for it.’’ She called it a ‘‘terribly-written and poorly-executed film’’ and further wrote, ‘‘Bunty Aur Babli 2 had all the right ingredients to serve a perfect dish, but too much mixing left it with no great after taste.’’ Shalini Langer from The Indian Express gave the film a rating of 2.5/5 and wrote, ‘‘Director Varun V. Sharma doesn’t think Rani Mukherji-Saif Ali Khan are enough to repeat the success of the original, so he keeps falling back on Siddhant and Sharvari, who are not bad but nothing we haven’t seen before. However, his bigger crime is reducing the original Bunty and Babli to colorful, atrocious parodies of their selves.’’ Ronak Kotecha from The Times of India gave the film a rating of 2.5/5 and wrote, ‘‘Bunty Aur Babli 2 had an exciting premise to revive the two iconic characters, but this sequel feels like quite a con-job in comparison with its original.’’ Saibal Chatterjee from NDTV gave the film a rating of 2/5 and wrote, ‘‘Comic timing comes easy to Rani and Saif; They are saddled with wisecracks that are devoid of wisdom. Siddhant and Sharvari, who don a variety of guises, make an enthusiastic screen pair; But the script plays spoilsport." Anupama Chopra of Film Companion wrote, ‘‘Bunty Aur Babli 2 has a repetitive plot and forgettable dialogues; Few of the jokes land and the ease with which the cons are pulled off becomes, beyond a point, plain silly.’’

Bollywood Hungama gave the film a rating of 1.5/5 and wrote, ‘‘Bunty Aur Babli 2 is a poor show and no way close to the first part.’’ They praised the performances of Chaturvedi and Wagh, but criticized Mukerji and Khan's performance by stating, ‘‘Rani Mukerji is too loud and over the top and is not in sync with her character in the first half; Saif Ali Khan is not in a great form and its pretty shocking since he's known to ace in all kinds of genres. Siddhant Chaturvedi leaves a mark and proves that he's a hero material and Sharvari Wagh makes a confident debut and looks sizzling.’’  Devansh Sharma of Firstpost gave the film a rating of 2/5 and wrote, ‘‘Bunty Aur Babli 2 is sincere in its attempt to keep the brand alive and continue the narrative organically; But it chooses to ignore all the signs, all the red flags, and decides to cover them up under a flashy exterior. It touches upon the pros and cons of conning in the age of internet and social media, but only superficially. It also comments on the unsuccessful attempts at Ganga rejuvenation by the current government, but never takes a dive into it.’’

Box office 
Bunty Aur Babli 2 earned 2.60 crore at the domestic box office on its opening day and 8.30 crore in its opening weekend.

As of December 16, 2021, the film has earned 14.88 crore in India and 7.24 crore overseas, for a worldwide total of  crore.

Soundtrack 

The film's music was composed by Shankar–Ehsaan–Loy while the lyrics were written by Amitabh Bhattacharya.

References

External links 
 
 

Indian crime comedy films
Indian sequel films
Films postponed due to the COVID-19 pandemic
Yash Raj Films films
2020s Hindi-language films